Andy Piercy is a British singer-songwriter who came to prominence in the gospel beat acoustic duo Ishmael and Andy, together with Ian Smale (Ishmael).

In 1974, Piercy replaced John Leach as guitarist and lead vocalist in After the Fire. He stayed with that group, later taking on bass duties, until they disbanded in 1983.

Subsequently, Piercy was record producer for many British Christian musicians, including Delirious? (their original Cutting Edge recordings and the album King of Fools), Matt Redman and Split Level.

Discography
with Ishmael (Ian Smale) and Andy
 Ready Salted (1973)

with After the Fire
 Signs of Change (1978)
 Laser Love (1979)
 80-f (1980)
 Batteries Not Included (1982)
 Der Kommissar (1982)

with Dave Clifton
 Praise God from Whom All Blessings Flow (1994)
 Psalms, Hymns & Spiritual Songs (1996)

References

External links
Andy Piercy official site
After the Fire biography at NME

Year of birth missing (living people)
Living people
British performers of Christian music
English male singer-songwriters
English rock guitarists
English male guitarists
Male new wave singers